The 2000 Zagreb local elections were held on 7 May 2000 for members of the Zagreb Assembly. The elections were called after the Croatian Democratic Union (HDZ) lost the majority in the Assembly, and the Croatian Government dismissed it and appointed an acting mayor.

In a record low turnout, the Zagreb Alternative coalition, led by the Social Democratic Party (SDP) and the Croatian Social Liberal Party (HSLS), won a majority of seats in the Assembly. The HNS was the biggest surprise in the election and won nine seats, while the HDZ suffered a heavy defeat and gained only five seats. Milan Bandić, who led the list of the SDP, was elected mayor by the Zagreb Assembly on 31 May.

Background
In the 2000 Croatian parliamentary election, a coalition led by the two major Croatian opposition parties, the Social Democratic Party of Croatia (SDP) and the Croatian Social Liberal Party (HSLS), won the majority in the Croatian Parliament and defeated the ruling Croatian Democratic Union (HDZ), which was in power since 1990. Milan Bandić, the leader of the SDP's Zagreb branch, said that they will "not wait for the local elections in 2001 to take over power in Zagreb", where the HDZ held the majority since the 1997 local elections and the end of the Zagreb Crisis. Bandić collected the resignations of all 24 members of the opposition parties in the Zagreb Assembly, as well as from two HDZ members. The new Croatian Government immediately dismissed the Zagreb Assembly and appointed Josip Kregar as the acting mayor, in place of incumbent HDZ's Marina Matulović-Dropulić. Though the two HDZ members later withdrew their resignations, Kregar said that it was "too late".

On 11 March, the HDZ's Zagreb branch appointed Davorin Tepeš as its president, replacing the dismissed Zlatko Canjuga. Kregar formally became the acting mayor on 13 March, and snap elections were called for 7 May.

The SDP and the HSLS participated in the elections in a coalition with the Croatian Peasant Party (HSS), the Social Democratic Action of Croatia (ASH), the Liberal Party (LS), and the Croatian Party of Pensioners (HSU). The coalition's name was Zagreb Alternative.

Results
38 members of the Zagreb Assembly were elected proportionally using the D'Hondt method, and 12 were elected in 12 electoral districts by a majority system. The Zagreb Alternative coalition won all 12 seats in the electoral districts. Along with the proportional system, the SDP won a total of 15 seats, the HSLS won 10 seats, the HNS 9 seats, the ASH–LS coalition six seats, the HDZ five, the Democratic Centre (DC) three, and the HSS two.

The turnout of around 33% was unexpectedly low, compared to more than 67% in the previous elections. While the SDP and HSLS-led Zagreb Alternative secured a majority in the Assembly, they won an average of 15% less votes in Zagreb compared to the parliamentary election in January. The strong performance of the HNS, by winning slightly fewer votes than the SDP and much more than the HSLS, was the biggest surprise in the elections. The HDZ gained only five seats, but won more votes than the polls before the elections predicted.

On 31 May, the Assembly elected Bandić as the new mayor, and Darinko Kosor (HSLS) and Mladen Vilfan (LS) as his deputies. Franjo Zenko (HSLS) became the president of the Assembly.

Assembly election

See also
List of mayors of Zagreb

References 

Zagreb 2000
Zagreb
Zagreb
Elections in Zagreb
2000s in Zagreb